Şehitler can refer to one of the following places in Turkey:

 Şehitler, Enez
 Şehitler, Narman